Lara Victoria van Ruijven (28 December 1992  10 July 2020) was a Dutch short track speed skater.  At the 2018 Winter Olympics, she was part of the Dutch 3000 metres relay team that won a bronze medal.  She won gold at the World Championships one year later. By doing so, she became the first Dutch woman to win a world short track title at an individual event.

Early life
Lara Victoria van Ruijven was born in Naaldwijk (near The Hague) on December 28 1992. She began racing short track when she was six, and her childhood idol was Evgenia Radanova. She studied law at the Open University of the Netherlands and resided in Heerenveen.  In addition to her native Dutch, she also spoke English and French.

Career
Van Ruijven first competed as a member of the Dutch Olympic team at the 2014 Winter Olympics. In the 500 metres she was third in her heat, failing to advance, and placing 17th overall. As a member of the Dutch 3000 metre relay team, she was disqualified in the heats, again not advancing.  Throughout that year, she had problems with her knee that compelled her to change her training routine.  Three years later, in September 2017, she dislocated her shoulder.

She breakthrough year came in 2018, when she earned her first Olympic medal at that year's Winter Games, as part of the Dutch team that finished third in the 3000 metre relay.  Several weeks later, she secured her first medal at the World Championships, when her team finished runner-up in the 3000 metre relay.

At the 2019 World Championships, Van Ruijven won a gold medal in the  event and was in the lead for almost the entirety of the race. However, the Dutch team were unable to improve on their result in the 3000 metre relay from the previous year and dropped to fourth place.  By securing gold, she became the first Dutch woman to win a world short track title at an individual event. Van Ruijven finished fourth overall in terms of total points won at the championships.

Illness and death
Van Ruijven was hospitalized on 25 June 2020, after falling ill during a stay at a training camp near Font-Romeu-Odeillo-Via. Four days later, she was transferred to an intensive care unit due to an autoimmune disease. She was subsequently placed in a coma and underwent multiple surgeries, but her condition did not improve. She died on 10 July 2020 at a hospital in Perpignan, France; she was 27 years old.

Achievements

World Cup victories
Source:

References

External links

 
 
 

1992 births
2020 deaths
Deaths from autoimmune disease
Dutch female short track speed skaters
Olympic short track speed skaters of the Netherlands
Olympic bronze medalists for the Netherlands
Olympic medalists in short track speed skating
Short track speed skaters at the 2014 Winter Olympics
Short track speed skaters at the 2018 Winter Olympics
Medalists at the 2018 Winter Olympics
Sportspeople from The Hague
World Short Track Speed Skating Championships medalists